Agent Red is a 2000 American action film directed by Damian Lee and Jim Wynorski and starring Dolph Lundgren. Its plot concerns two soldiers stuck on a submarine with a group of terrorists who plan to use a chemical weapon on America.

After the film was completed, producer Andrew Stevens deemed it too inept to be released. Screenwriter Steve Latshaw was brought in to make the film at least half-competent, while Wynorski was hired to direct some new scenes (about 40 minutes of footage in three days) and insert stock footage (mostly from Fred Olen Ray's Counter Measures with Michael Dudikoff from which it became a remake of) where appropriate.

Plot
Captain Matt Hendricks and Dr. Linda Christian are locked in a submarine with Russian terrorists that threaten to launch a chemical virus on US territory.

Cast

 Dolph Lundgren as Captain Matt Hendricks  
 Meilani Paul as Dr. Linda Christian
 Alexander Kuznetsov as Kretz
 Natalie Radford as Nadia
 Randolph Mantooth as Admiral Edwards
 Neal Matarazzo as Lieutenant Matarazzo
 Tony Becker as Lieutenant Jack Colson
 Steve Eastin as Commander Russell
 Allan Kolman as Ziggy
 Larry Carroll as Newscaster
 Robert Donavan as General Minowski
 Pat Skelton as Borenz
 Melissa Brasselle as Dr. Baker
 Steve Franken as General Socka
 Lenny Juliano as Captain
 Peter Spellos as Col. Korsky

External links
 
 

2000 films
American action films
2000 action films
Films about bioterrorism
Films directed by Damian Lee
Films about terrorism
Franchise Pictures films
Pirate films
Submarine films
Films with screenplays by Damian Lee
2000s English-language films
2000s American films